Anguiano is an comarca in La Rioja province in Spain.

References